John A. Heaton is an American retired pharmacist and former member of the New Mexico House of Representatives who lives in Carlsbad, New Mexico. He served in the legislature from 1997 to 2010, representing district 55, Eddy County.

A  building at the National Cave and Karst Research Institute in Carlsbad was named after him in 2016.

References

Living people
Year of birth missing (living people)
Members of the New Mexico House of Representatives